Kubwa is a monotypic genus of East African araneomorph spiders in the family Cyatholipidae containing the single species, Kubwa singularis. It was first described by C. E. Griswold in 2001, and has only been found in Tanzania.

References

Endemic fauna of Tanzania
Cyatholipidae
Spiders described in 2001
Spiders of Africa